Joseph Robbie (July 7, 1916 – January 7, 1990) was an American attorney, politician, and the principal founder of the Miami Dolphins.

Early life
Robbie was raised in Sisseton, South Dakota, the second of five children. His father was a Lebanese immigrant and restaurant manager; his mother was a baker and the daughter of Irish immigrants. He was raised Catholic.

At 14 years old, Robbie was the sportswriter for his local newspaper, The People's Press. In 1934, during the Great Depression, Robbie dropped out of high school to work as a lumberjack for the Civilian Conservation Corps in the Black Hills, sending $25 of his $30 monthly earnings home to his family. After completing his high school education in 1936, Robbie enrolled at Northern State Teachers College on a debating scholarship. After three years, he transferred to the University of South Dakota. Robbie met his future wife, Elizabeth, while he was a senior at the school and she was a freshman. The couple were married two years later.

Robbie enlisted in the Navy on the day after the Japanese attack on Pearl Harbor. Robbie saw substantial action in the Pacific theater and was awarded a Bronze Star for his service. After his discharge, he used the G.I. Bill to return to University of South Dakota School of Law as a law student.

Politics
Following his graduation from law school, Robbie worked as a deputy state's attorney and a professor of economics at Dakota Wesleyan University. In 1948, at 33 years old, Robbie entered politics. He was elected to the South Dakota House of Representatives as a Democrat. In 1950, he ran for Governor of South Dakota but lost to Sigurd Anderson. The following year, Robbie and his family moved to Minneapolis at the encouragement of then-mayor Hubert H. Humphrey.

His political and business careers further developed in Minnesota. In addition to operating his own law firm, Robbie served as regional counsel for the Office of Price Stabilization in Minnesota, Montana, North Dakota and South Dakota. He was also a charter member of the Twin Cities Metropolitan Commission and chairman of the Minnesota Municipal Commission. In addition to working on Humphrey's political campaigns, Robbie represented Minnesota's 5th congressional district at the 1960 Democratic National Convention.

Robbie also worked as a lobbyist for the tobacco industry from the 1960s until his death. In 1963, he appeared before the United States Senate to voice opposition to a bill which would have regulated tobacco advertising. From 1971 until 1989, he was the head of the  Minnesota Candy & Tobacco Distributors Association.

Professional sports
After moving to Minneapolis, Robbie took an interest in professional football and became a Minnesota Vikings season ticket holder. 

In March 1965, Joe Foss, the commissioner of the American Football League, met with Robbie in Washington, D.C. Foss had attended the University of South Dakota, later serving in the Marine Corps and being awarded the Medal of Honor. 

At the meeting, Foss recommended that Robbie look into Miami as a potential site for an expansion franchise. Robbie formed a partnership with comedian Danny Thomas, a fellow Lebanese-American, and raised the $7.5 million required to purchase an expansion team.

The Dolphins' stadium was officially called Joe Robbie Stadium from its opening in 1987 until 1996. It has undergone a series of name changes since, and it is currently known as Hard Rock Stadium.

Robbie had a small part playing himself in the film Black Sunday, in which he is interviewed about security for Super Bowl X (1976).

Robbie also owned the Miami Toros and the Fort Lauderdale Strikers (later the Minnesota Strikers) soccer teams of the North American Soccer League. Joe Robbie Stadium was one of the first major stadiums in the U.S. designed with soccer in mind., and was also designed to be easily reconfigured for baseball. 

Robbie also believed that given Miami's rapid growth, it was a foregone conclusion that Miami would have a Major League Baseball team: this was proven correct when the city was granted a franchise, the Florida Marlins (now the Miami Marlins), in 1990, two months after Robbie's death.

Honors and awards
For his contributions to the Miami Dolphins, and being the founder of the team, Joe Robbie became the inaugural inductee on the Miami Dolphins Honor Roll on September 16, 1990 (eight months after his death).

References

Further reading

External links
 

|-

1916 births
1990 deaths
20th-century American businesspeople
20th-century American lawyers
20th-century American politicians
American lobbyists
American people of Irish descent
American people of Lebanese descent
American soccer chairmen and investors
Civilian Conservation Corps people
Dakota Wesleyan University faculty
Members of the South Dakota House of Representatives
Miami Dolphins owners
Minnesota Democrats
Minnesota lawyers
National Soccer Hall of Fame members
North American Soccer League (1968–1984) executives
People from Sisseton, South Dakota
Politicians from Minneapolis
South Dakota Democrats
South Dakota lawyers
United States Navy personnel of World War II
University of South Dakota School of Law alumni